Duke of Abruzzi's free-tailed bat (Chaerephon aloysiisabaudiae) is a species of bat in the family Molossidae. It is found in Cameroon, Central African Republic, Democratic Republic of the Congo, Ivory Coast, Gabon, Ghana, South Sudan, and Uganda. Its natural habitats are subtropical or tropical dry forest, subtropical or tropical moist lowland forest, and moist savanna. It is threatened by habitat loss.

Taxonomy and etymology
It was described as a new species in 1907 by Dr. E. Festa.
Festa placed it in the now-defunct genus Nyctinomus, with the name Nyctinomus Aloysii-Sabaudiae.
Its species name "aloysiisabaudiae" is a Latinization of one of the names of Prince Luigi Amedeo, the Duke of Abruzzi.
"Luigi" is an Italian variant of Latin Aloysius, while Latin "sabaudiae''" refers to the House of Savoy.

Description
Its fur is a light chestnut brown color.
Its flight membranes are blackish-brown.
It has large, rounded ears with very small tragi.
Its upper lip is very wrinkly.

Range and habitat
It is found in several countries in Africa, including Cameroon, Central African Republic, Democratic Republic of the Congo; Côte d'Ivoire; Gabon; Ghana; Sudan; and Uganda.

See also
Luigi Amedeo, Duke of the Abruzzi

Sources

Duke of Abruzzi's free-tailed bat
Bats of Africa
Fauna of Central Africa
Near threatened animals
Near threatened biota of Africa
Duke of Abruzzi's free-tailed bat
Taxonomy articles created by Polbot